Bettina Müller may refer to:

 Bettina Müller (canoeist) (born 1952), German canoeist
 Bettina Müller (politician) (born 1959), German politician, Member of the Bundestag since 2013
 Bettina Müller-Weissina (born 1973), Austrian sprinter